Carnage is a 2011 black comedy film directed by Roman Polanski, based on the Tony Award-winning 2006 play Le Dieu du carnage by French playwright Yasmina Reza. The screenplay is by Reza and Polanski. The film is an international co-production of France, Germany, Poland, and Spain. It stars Jodie Foster, Kate Winslet, Christoph Waltz, and John C. Reilly.
In this comedy of errors, two sets of parents try to resolve a situation in a civilised manner as their idiosyncrasies rise to the surface.

Carnage premiered at the 2011 Venice International Film Festival on 1 September 2011, where it competed for the Golden Lion. It was theatrically released on 18 November 2011. The film received positive reviews, with critics praising the performances of Foster and Winslet and Polanski's direction.
At the 69th Golden Globe Awards, Foster and Winslet received nominations for Best Actress – Motion Picture Musical or Comedy. As of 2022, it is Polanski's last film to be shot in English until his upcoming film The Palace.

Plot
When two grade-school boys get into a fight in the park that results in one boy, Zachary Cowan, hitting the other, Ethan Longstreet, in the face with a stick, their parents meet in a Brooklyn apartment to discuss the matter. Zachary's parents, Alan (Christoph Waltz) and Nancy Cowan (Kate Winslet), visit the home of Michael (John C. Reilly) and Penelope Longstreet (Jodie Foster), Ethan's parents. Their meeting is initially intended to be short, but due to various circumstances, the conversation continues to draw out.
In fact, Alan and Nancy begin to leave the apartment on two occasions, but are drawn back in to further discussion.

At first, the couples are friendly to each other, but their respective comments start to hurt feelings, making everyone argue with one another. Apart from fighting amongst themselves, the couples blame each other about who is responsible for the fight between their sons. Nancy calls the Longstreets "superficially fair-minded" and Penelope and Michael complain about Alan's arrogant and dull attitude. Everyone also gets irritated with Alan when he accepts endless business phone calls on his BlackBerry, interrupting the discussion, and showing he has more interest in his business problems than the matter at hand. Michael also receives many phone calls from his ailing mother, to his frustration.

Nancy accuses Michael of being a murderer because he, annoyed by the constant noise it made during the night, had earlier turned his daughter Courtney's pet hamster loose in the street. Penelope becomes emotional about the hamster and with everyone arguing with each other. Other issues include a risky drug Alan is working to defend and Michael's mother has been prescribed, and the question of idealism and responsibility that is part of Penelope's current work.

Michael offers everyone a glass of fine scotch. Penelope claims she doesn't "get drunk" and Nancy drinks way too many and finally stops Alan's phone calls by dropping his cellphone in Penelope's flower vase full of tulips and water. Penelope and Nancy both laugh uproariously while Michael and Alan try to blow-dry the BlackBerry.

The conversation continues to decay into personal attacks and opinionated statements and, eventually, epithets are uttered. Penelope is ranting, calling Nancy's son a 'snitch', and Nancy's true colors are revealed when she destroys the tulips and drunkenly and vulgarly states she is glad that her son beat up Penelope's and Michael's son. The couples realize the conversation is going nowhere. Alan's BlackBerry, lying on the coffee table, vibrates, and all four stare at it.

The film cuts to the hamster, alive and well in the park, where Ethan and Zachary are reconciling on their own.

Cast
 Jodie Foster as Penelope Longstreet
 Kate Winslet as Nancy Cowan
 Christoph Waltz as Alan Cowan
 John C. Reilly as Michael Longstreet
 Elvis Polanski as Zachary Cowan
 Eliot Berger as Ethan Longstreet
 Julie Adams as Alan’s secretary
 Roman Polanski as a neighbor (uncredited cameo)

Production
Although set in Brooklyn, New York, the film was shot in Paris, because of Polanski's fugitive status. The opening and closing scenes, ostensibly filmed in Brooklyn Bridge Park, were shot in France against a green screen. Polanski's son Elvis, seen only in long shots in the opening and closing scenes, portrays the Cowans' son. Actress Julie Adams (famous for Creature from the Black Lagoon) voices Alan Cowan's secretary on the phone, and was a dialect coach for Waltz.

The apartment, in which almost the whole film takes place, was designed in a sound studio on the outskirts of Paris. Production designer Dean Tavoularis placed a priority on making the set look authentically American, having numerous products and appliances shipped from the US, and renting American ironmongery for the doors.

Release
The film premiered at the 68th Venice International Film Festival. The film was released in the United States on 16 December 2011 by Sony Pictures Classics.

Reception

Critical response
Carnage received generally positive reviews from critics. It holds  "fresh" rating on Rotten Tomatoes, which notes that "it isn't as compelling on the screen as it was on the stage, but Carnage makes up for its flaws with Polanski's smooth direction and assured performances from Winslet and Foster." On Metacritic, which uses an average of the critics' reviews, the film holds a 61/100, indicating "Generally favorable reviews".

John Anderson of Newsday compared the film to Who's Afraid of Virginia Woolf? and said: "The astonishing Waltz steals the picture, possibly because he's the one with a rational perspective (despite his telephonic obsessiveness). He sees the whole exercise as pointless. Ultimately, so do we." Giuseppe Sedia of the Krakow Post remarked that the descent of four adults to a thuggish level has been featured as well in Polanski's short film Rozbijemy zabawę. He added that "it is interesting to speculate on what Hitchcock might have made of Reza's oeuvre".

Box office
Carnage grossed $2.5 million at the U.S. box office after twenty weeks in theaters, with another $25 million in foreign countries, for a worldwide gross of $27,603,069.

Accolades
Golden Globe Awards
Best Actress – Motion Picture Musical or Comedy - Jodie Foster (nominee)
Best Actress – Motion Picture Musical or Comedy - Kate Winslet (nominee)

Satellite Awards
Best Supporting Actress - Motion Picture - Kate Winslet (nominee)
Best Supporting Actor - Motion Picture - Christoph Waltz (nominee)

European Film Awards
Best Actress - Kate Winslet (nominee)
Best Screenwriter - Roman Polanski and Yasmina Reza (nominee)

Goya Awards
Best European Film - Roman Polanski (nominee)

César Award
Best Writing – Adaptation - Roman Polanski and Yasmina Reza (nominee)

Cinema Writers of Spain
Best Adapted Screenplay - Roman Polanski, Yasmina Reza (nominee)

Boston Society of Film Critics
Best Ensemble Cast - Kate Winslet, Jodie Foster, Christoph Waltz and John C. Reilly

San Diego Film Critics Society Awards
Best Ensemble Performance - Kate Winslet, Jodie Foster, Christoph Waltz and John C. Reilly (nominee)

68th Venice International Film Festival
Nominated - Golden Lion
Won - Little Golden Lion

References

External links

 
 
 
 
 
 

2011 films
2011 comedy-drama films
French comedy-drama films
German black comedy films
German comedy-drama films
Spanish independent films
Polish black comedy films
American comedy-drama films
2010s English-language films
Films directed by Roman Polanski
Spanish black comedy films
French black comedy films
Films about dysfunctional families
Films about social class
French films based on plays
Films set in apartment buildings
Films set in Brooklyn
Films shot in Paris
Constantin Film films
Sony Pictures Classics films
French independent films
German independent films
Polish independent films
Films scored by Alexandre Desplat
Films with screenplays by Roman Polanski
English-language French films
English-language German films
English-language Spanish films
English-language Polish films
2010s French films
2010s German films